Good name may refer to:

 Good name, an alternative term for a person's given name in South Asia
 Good Name, a film directed by Evgeniy Sivokon
 Good Name, an album by William Onyeabor
 "A Good Name", an episode of the television series The Scarlet Pimpernel
 "A Good Name", a song by Shad from the album TSOL